Line Walker: Bull Fight, also known as Line Walker 3, is a 2020 crime drama produced by Tencent Penguin Pictures and TVB. It serves as the sequel season to both Line Walker (2014) and  Line Walker: The Prelude (2017). It stars Raymond Lam, Michael Miu, Kenneth Ma, Benjamin Yuen, Mandy Wong,  Priscilla Wong, Sisley Choi, Owen Cheung and Benz Hui.

Line Walker: Bull Fight premiered on 12 October 2020 on myTV Gold, TVB Anywhere, Tencent Video and Astro Go. For myTV Gold and TVB Anywhere, the first eight episodes are uploaded on 12 October and two episodes are uploaded on every Monday, Tuesday and Wednesday afterwards. For Tencent Video and Astro Go, two episodes are uploaded on every Monday, Tuesday and Wednesday starting from 12 October. The series premiered on 9 November 2020 on TVB Jade in Hong Kong.

Synopsis  
Set in Hong Kong, China, four years after the events in Line Walker, Sit Ka Keung (Raymond Lam) continues to work as a Hong Kong Police Criminal Intelligence Bureau (CIB) undercover officer, while Cheuk Hoi (Michael Miu) opens a coffee shop after being released from prison. CIB Chief Inspector Cheung Kei Gee (Mandy Wong) suspects Cheuk of joining the triad and investigates him. The Security Bureau establishes Security Intelligence Agency (SIA), a new intelligence department. The principal investigator of SIA, Wai Chok Wing (Kenneth Ma) invites Tsui Tin Tong (Benjamin Yuen) to join SIA. Chum Foon Hei (Benz Hui), who was thought to be killed by Seed, returns to Hong Kong to track down the leader of an international crime organization, Eternity. The true identity of Wai  is later revealed to be Ngai Tak Lai, the younger paternal half-brother of Victor Ngai Tak Shun...

Cast and characters

Main Cast

Supporting Cast

Other Supporting Cast

Cameos

References 

2020s crime drama television series
2020 Hong Kong television series debuts
2020s Hong Kong television series
Chinese-language television shows
Hong Kong crime television series
Hong Kong drama television series
Triad (organized crime)